The 1993 European Open Water Swimming Championships was the third edition of the European Open Water Swimming Championships and took part from 28 to 29 August 1993 in Slapy, Czech Republic.

Results

Men

Women

Medal table

See also
 List of medalists at the European Open Water Swimming Championships

References

External links
 Ligue Européenne de Natation LEN Official Website

European Open Water Swimming Championships
European Open Water Championships